Herschelle Gibbs is a former South African cricketer who represented his country between 1996 and 2010. He made centuries (100 or more runs in a single innings) on 14 and 21 occasions in Test and One Day International (ODI) matches respectively. With over 14,000 runs, Gibbs is fourth in the list of South Africa's most prolific run-scorers in international cricket.  Wisden Cricketers' Almanack included him among its "top 40 cricketers of 2004".

Gibbs made his Test and ODI debuts in 1996 against India and Kenya respectively. However, it was only in 1999 that he made his first century, when he scored 125 against the West Indies, an ODI South Africa won at St George's Park, Port Elizabeth. He followed that with another century against Australia in the 1999 World Cup, although this time in a losing cause. In 2002, Gibbs made three centuries in consecutive innings, equaling a record that was previously held by two other players. He was denied a fourth successive century when he remained 97 not out against Bangladesh. His career-best score of 175, achieved against Australia, led South Africa to the most successful run-chase in the history of ODIs. Gibbs made a minimum of one century each year from 1999 to 2009. As of October 2015, he is jointly second with Hashim Amla (both with 21 centuries) in the number of ODI centuries among his countrymen, only behind AB de Villiers (22).

Gibbs' first Test century, 211 not out, was made against New Zealand at the AMI Stadium, Christchurch, in March 1999. His highest score of 228 came against Pakistan at the Newlands Cricket Ground, Cape Town in 2003. These two are the only instances of his scoring above 200. In Tests, Gibbs scored centuries against all Test-playing teams except Sri Lanka. In ODIs, Gibbs scored centuries against 10 different teams, including all nine Test-playing teams. On 6 February 2005, he became only the second batsman, after Australia's Ricky Ponting, to score an ODI century against all Test playing nations, when he scored 100 against England. Gibbs also played 23 Twenty20 Internationals (T20I) for South Africa between 2005 and 2010. He did not score any centuries in the format; his best score of 90 not out came against the West Indies.

Key

Test centuries

One Day International centuries

Notes

References

External links
 
 

Gibbs
Gibbs, Herschelle